The 1975–76 Midland Football League was the 76th in the history of the Midland Football League, a football competition in England.

Also this season the league introduced Division One.

Premier Division

The Premier Division featured 18 clubs which competed in the previous season, no new clubs joined the division this season.

League table

Division One

League table

References

Midland Football League (1889)
8